Norwegian Journal of Geology is a quarterly peer-reviewed scientific journal published by the Norwegian Geological Society. The scope of the journal is the geology of Norway, the Arctic, and nearby seas. The journal adopted the Creative Commons Attribution License for published works since volume 94, issue 4 (2014).

Abstracting and indexing 
The journal is abstracted and indexed in:

See also 
Fennia
Geografiska Annaler
Norwegian Journal of Geography

References

External links 
 

Geology journals
Multilingual journals
Norwegian-language journals
English-language journals
1905 establishments in Norway
Publications established in 1905
Quarterly journals
Creative Commons Attribution-licensed journals